Audrey Tang (born 18 April 1981) is a Taiwanese free software programmer and the inaugural Minister of Digital Affairs of the Republic of China (Taiwan), who has been described as one of the "ten greatest Taiwanese computing personalities". In August 2016, Tang was invited to join Taiwan's Executive Yuan as a minister without portfolio, making her the first transgender and the first non-binary official in the top executive cabinet. Tang has identified as "post-gender" and accepts "whatever pronoun people want to describe me with online." Tang is a community leader of Haskell and Perl and the core member of g0v.

Early life
Tang was born Tang Tsung-han to father Tang Kuang-hua and mother Lee Ya-ching. Lee Ya-ching helped develop Taiwan's first consumer co-operative, and co-developed an experimental primary school employing indigenous teachers. Tang was a child prodigy, reading works of classical literature before the age of five, advanced mathematics before six, and programming before eight, and she began to learn Perl at age 12. Tang spent part of her childhood in Germany. Two years later, she dropped out of junior high school, unable to adapt to student life. By the year 2000, at the age of 19, Tang had already held positions in software companies, and worked in California's Silicon Valley as an entrepreneur.

In late 2005, Tang began transitioning to female, including changing her English and Chinese names, citing a need to reconcile her outward appearance with her self-image. In 2017, Tang said, "I've been shutting reality off, and lived almost exclusively on the net for many years, because my brain knows for sure that I am a woman, but the social expectations demand otherwise." In 2019, Tang identified as "post-gender" or non-binary, responding to a request regarding pronoun preferences with "What’s important here is not which pronouns you use, but the experience...about those pronouns... I’m not just non-binary. I’m really whatever, so do whatever."

The television news channel ETToday reported that Tang has an IQ of 180. Tang has been a vocal proponent for autodidacticism and individualist anarchism.

Free software contributions
Tang initiated and led the Pugs project, a joint effort from the Haskell and Perl communities to implement the Perl 6 language; Tang also made contributions to internationalization and localization efforts for several Free Software programs, including SVK (a version-control software written in Perl for which Tang also wrote a large portion of the code), Request Tracker, and Slash, created Ethercalc, building on Dan Bricklin's work on WikiCalc and their work together on SocialCalc, as well as heading Traditional Chinese translation efforts for various open source-related books.

On CPAN, Tang initiated over 100 Perl projects between June 2001 and July 2006, including the popular Perl Archive Toolkit (PAR), a cross-platform packaging and deployment tool for Perl 5. Tang is also responsible for setting up smoke test and digital signature systems for CPAN. In October 2005, Tang was a speaker at O'Reilly Media's European Open Source Convention in Amsterdam.

Political career

Tang became involved in politics during Taiwan's 2014 Sunflower Student Movement demonstrations, in which Tang volunteered to help the protesters occupying the Taiwanese parliament building broadcast their message. The prime minister invited Tang to build media literacy curricula for Taiwan's schools, which was implemented in late 2017. Following this work, Tang was appointed minister without portfolio for digital affairs in the Lin Chuan cabinet in August 2016, and took office as the digital minister on October 1, being placed in charge of helping government agencies communicate policy goals and managing information published by the government, both via digital means. At age 35, Tang was the youngest minister without portfolio in Taiwanese history and was given this role to bridge the gap between the older and younger generations.

As a conservative anarchist, Tang ultimately desires the abolition of Taiwan and all states, and justifies working for the state by the opportunity it affords to promote worthwhile ends. Tang's conservatism stems from wanting to preserve free public spaces independent from the state, such as Internet properties, and wanting technological advances to be applied humanistically so that all, rather than a few, can reap its benefits, to the exclusion of others. 
Tang's department does not follow hierarchical or bureaucratic relationships. As of 2017, Tang's staff of 15 chose to work in the department. The group produces a weekly roadmap as collaborators, not orders. Tang was quoted as saying, "My existence is not to become a minister for a certain group, nor to broadcast government propaganda. Instead, it is to become a 'channel' to allow greater combinations of intelligence and strength to come together."

Tang's first initiative, the g0v project, involved swapping out the "o" for a zero in the government's "gov.tw" top-level domain to view more accessible and interactive versions of those governmental websites. The project was open source, in line with Tang's principles, and very popular, accessed millions of times each month. Another initiative, vTaiwan, uses social media paradigms for citizens to create digital petitions. Those with 5,000 signatures are brought to the premier and government ministries to be addressed. Changes implemented through this system include access to income tax software for non-Windows computers, and changes to cancer treatment regulations. The Taiwanese parliament complained that citizens had better access to influence regulation than they did as legislators. As of 2017, Tang was working on sharing economy software that would facilitate the free exchange of resources in abundance instead of the ride-sharing and peer hotel applications for which the technology is known.

As a general practice of "radical transparency", all of Tang's meetings are recorded, transcribed, and uploaded to a public website. Tang also publicly responds to questions sent through another website.

In 2022, Tang hosted the video podcast "Innovative Minds with Audrey Tang" in a collaboration with TaiwanPlus, an international streaming service. Guests on the program include Steve Chen, Vitalik Buterin, and Sandra Oudkirk.

In January 2023 Tang become an e-resident of Lithuania which was announced during her first foreign visit as Digital Affairs minister in Vilnius, Lithuania.

References

Publications

Further reading

"The Frontiers Of Digital Democracy – Nathan Gardels interviews Tang in Noema

External links

 Audrey's Pugs Journal and Personal Blog
 Audrey's Medium page
 An interview with Autrijus by Debby (in Mandarin)
 Podcast interview with Audrey on Perlcast
 Perl Archive Toolkit
 Audrey's contributions on CPAN
 "SocialCalc"

Free software programmers
Perl writers
Taiwanese computer programmers
1981 births
Living people
Taiwanese computer scientists
Taiwanese Ministers of Digital Affairs
21st-century Taiwanese scientists
Taiwanese LGBT scientists
Transgender politicians
Transgender scientists
Non-binary scientists
Transgender non-binary people
21st-century Taiwanese LGBT people
Taiwanese transgender people
Taiwanese non-binary people
Individualist anarchists
Taiwanese anarchists
Non-binary politicians
Taiwanese LGBT politicians
Wikipedia people